The 1940 Cal Aggies football team represented the College of Agriculture at Davis—now known as the University of California, Davis—as a member of the Far Western Conference (FWC) during the 1940 college football season. Led by fourth-year head coach Vern Hickey, the Aggies compiled an overall record of 4–4 with a mark of 2–1 in conference play, placing second in the FWC. The team outscored its opponents 120 to 81 for the season. The Cal Aggies played home games at A Street field on campus in Davis, California.

Schedule

Notes

References

Cal Aggies
UC Davis Aggies football seasons
Cal Aggies football